Circle C Ranch (also known as Circle C) is a large master-planned community in southwest Austin, Texas, USA. Development of Circle C Ranch began in 1982, with the first homes in the community in built in 1986. During development, the subdivision was featured prominently in a long and contentious environmental legal battle regarding urban development in the vicinity of Barton Springs and over Edwards Aquifer. The controversy surrounding its development and later annexation by the city of Austin was a landmark in municipal annexation rights in Texas.

Today, Circle C Ranch includes more than 5,614 homes. The Circle C Swim Center has a year-round, outdoor, Olympic-size heated pool. A second, family-oriented swimming pool complex, with adjacent office space and meeting rooms, was finished at the end of January 2012. The third pool, found in the Avaña section of Circle C, was built in 2014 and opened in 2015. The fourth pool, located in the GreyRock section of Circle C, opened in 2017.

History

Development of Circle C Ranch began in 1982 when Gary Bradley, at the time a part-owner of the Schlotzsky's restaurant chain, and his development partners began to earn development permits and acquire land in southwest Austin, Texas. However, several local environmentalist groups including the Save Our Springs Alliance (SOS) were strongly opposed to the development due to the subdivision's planned location over the recharge zone of the Edwards Aquifer. Despite the strong opposition, the first homes in Circle C were built in 1986. In 1988, the Save Barton Creek Association filed a lawsuit against the Texas Highway Department in order to stop the extension of Texas State Highway Loop 1 into southwest Austin and to halt further development of Circle C Ranch. However, the subdivision's homeowner association was able to defend its rights to the land, and thus development continued.

By 1990, Circle C Ranch was considered the top selling subdivision in Central Texas. However, in the same year, the Gibraltar Savings and Loan bank based in California failed to pay off its debts, and all of its assets were transferred; at the time, this was one of the largest insolvencies in American history. Since the savings and loan company was the source for much of the money and resources involved in the development of Circle C Ranch, the subdivision went bankrupt and entered Chapter 11 reorganization status; reorganization was completed in 1992. Over the following years, several ordinances and lawsuits were filed in relation to Circle C Ranch and its environmental implications, resulting in the creation of the Southwest Travis County Water and Reclamation District in 1996 and the Slaughter Creek Water Protection Zone the following year. However, both the water district and protection zone were found unconstitutional because they were located within the City of Austin's extraterritorial jurisdiction and conflicted with the City's powers. On December 18, 1997, Circle C Ranch was involuntarily annexed by the City of Austin after roughly 15 years of development.

Schools 
All of Circle C Ranch is served by the Austin Independent School District. Portions of the Avaña section in Hays County are located in the Hays Consolidated Independent School District, but students there are allowed to attend AISD schools.

In popular culture
The reality television series Welcome to the Neighborhood was set in Circle C Ranch, in which five families competed to win a house in the neighborhood.

References

Sources
 FM Properties Inc. comments on Texas state legislature actions
 Bradley adds  to Circle C
 Gary Bradley Will Not Get Away With Taking $73 Million from the Taxpayers to Build Circle C
 Houston's Long Shadow - Austin-Bashing: It's Not Over Yet
 Chasing Gary - To Annex or Not to Annex
 Ordinance annexing for full purposes the CIRCLE C ANNEXATION AREA - Austin City Council 12/11/97 Meeting item
 Hearing Reviews Limits on City Annexation and Development Powers - Texas House of Representatives
 Annexed citizens vs. City of Austin
 "Local Control"- Texas Style
 Boomtime in Austin, Texas: Negotiated Growth Management
 Bradley, city compromising
 City to pay about $10M in Circle C dispute
 A Revolt Brews Among the Circle C Masses
 Circle C Homeowners Association and City of Austin Settlement Agreement
 Reimbursement Claim Agreement between Circle C Land Corp. and City of Austin
 The Battle for the Springs: A Chronology
 Dotting i's, Circling C's - Simplifying the Tortured History of Circle C
 Austin developer Gary Lee Bradley - A Comprehensive Annotation
 Legal Proceedings - FM Properties Inc. Form 10-Q
 Save Our Springs Alliance and Circle C Neighborhood Assn v. City of Austin, Circle C Land Corp, and Stratus Properties
 Back In Black - SOS Is Arisen: Let the Confetti Rain Down
 Circle C golf club reinvents itself

External links
 Circle C Ranch Homeowners Association Website
 Bowie High School Website
 Gorzycki Middle School Website
 Kiker Elementary School Website
 Clayton Elementary School Website
 Grey Rock Golf Club Website
 Circle C Swim Team Website
 Circle C Weather Website
 Circle C Weather Website

Neighborhoods in Austin, Texas